David Ashley Fox (born February 25, 1971) is an American former competition swimmer who won a gold medal at the 1996 Summer Olympics held in Atlanta, and a four-time gold medalist at the World University Games.

Fox swam at the North Carolina State University, where he won seven Atlantic Coast Conference championships, and one NCAA national championship.

Fox was inducted into the North Carolina Sports Hall of Fame on May 6, 2016.

See also
 List of Olympic medalists in swimming (men)
 World record progression 4 × 100 metres freestyle relay

References

1971 births
Living people
American male freestyle swimmers
World record setters in swimming
Medalists at the FINA World Swimming Championships (25 m)
NC State Wolfpack men's swimmers
Olympic gold medalists for the United States in swimming
Swimmers at the 1996 Summer Olympics
North Carolina State University alumni
Jesse O. Sanderson High School alumni
Medalists at the 1996 Summer Olympics
Universiade medalists in swimming
Universiade gold medalists for the United States
Medalists at the 1993 Summer Universiade